Beaver Township may refer to:

Arkansas
 Beaver Township, Carroll County, Arkansas
 Beaver Township, Saline County, Arkansas

Illinois
 Beaver Township, Iroquois County, Illinois

Indiana
 Beaver Township, Newton County, Indiana
 Beaver Township, Pulaski County, Indiana

Iowa
 Beaver Township, Boone County, Iowa
 Beaver Township, Butler County, Iowa
 Beaver Township, Dallas County, Iowa
 Beaver Township, Grundy County, Iowa
 Beaver Township, Guthrie County, Iowa
 Beaver Township, Humboldt County, Iowa
 Beaver Township, Polk County, Iowa

Kansas
 Beaver Township, Barton County, Kansas
 Beaver Township, Cowley County, Kansas
 Beaver Township, Decatur County, Kansas
 Beaver Township, Lincoln County, Kansas, in Lincoln County, Kansas
 Beaver Township, Phillips County, Kansas, in Phillips County, Kansas
 Beaver Township, Republic County, Kansas
 Beaver Township, Scott County, Kansas, in Scott County, Kansas
 Beaver Township, Smith County, Kansas, in Smith County, Kansas

Michigan
 Beaver Township, Bay County, Michigan
 Beaver Township, Newaygo County, Michigan

Minnesota
 Beaver Township, Aitkin County, Minnesota
 Beaver Township, Fillmore County, Minnesota
 Beaver Township, Roseau County, Minnesota

Missouri
 Beaver Township, Taney County, Missouri

Nebraska
 Beaver Township, Buffalo County, Nebraska
 Beaver Township, Nance County, Nebraska

North Dakota
 Beaver Township, Benson County, North Dakota

Ohio
 Beaver Township, Mahoning County, Ohio
 Beaver Township, Noble County, Ohio
 Beaver Township, Pike County, Ohio

Pennsylvania
 Beaver Township, Clarion County, Pennsylvania
 Beaver Township, Columbia County, Pennsylvania
 Beaver Township, Crawford County, Pennsylvania
 Beaver Township, Jefferson County, Pennsylvania
 Beaver Township, Snyder County, Pennsylvania

South Dakota
 Beaver Township, Miner County, South Dakota, in Miner County, South Dakota

Township name disambiguation pages